{{DISPLAYTITLE:C3H6O2}}

The molecular formula C3H6O2 may refer to:

Acids and esters

Acid
Propanoic acid

Esters
Methyl acetate
Ethyl formate

Aldehydes and ketones
Lactaldehyde (2-hydroxypropanal)
(S)-Lactaldehyde
(R)-Lactaldehyde
Reuterin (3-hydroxypropanal)
Methoxyacetaldehyde
Hydroxyacetone

Alkenes

Diols
1-Propene-1,1-diol
1-Propene-1,2-diol
(E)-1-Propene-1,2-diol
(Z)-1-Propene-1,2-diol
1-Propene-1,3-diol
(E)-Propene-1,3-diol
(Z)-Propene-1,3-diol
2-Propene-1,1-diol
2-Propene-1,2-diol

Oxyethenol
1-Methoxyethenol

Cyclic

Three atoms in ring

No oxygen in ring 
1,1-Cyclopropandiol
Cyclopropan-1,2-diol
(E)-Cyclopropan-1,2-diol
(Z)-Cyclopropan-1,2-diol

One oxygen in ring 
 Glycidol (oxiran-2-ylmethanol)
(R)-Glycidol
(S)-Glycidol
 2-Methyloxiranol
(R)-2-Methyloxiranol
(S)-2-Methyloxiranol
3-Methyloxiranol
(R,R)-3-Methyloxiranol
(R,S)-3-Methyloxiranol
(S,R)-3-Methyloxiranol
(S,S)-3-Methyloxiranol

Two oxygens in ring
Dimethyldioxirane

Four atoms in ring

One oxygen in ring
Oxetan-3-ol
Oxetan-2-ol
(R)-Oxetan-2-ol
(S)-Oxetan-2-ol

Two oxygens in ring
3-Methyl-1,2-dioxetane
(R)-3-Methyl-1,2-dioxetane
(S)-3-Methyl-1,2-dioxetane
2-Methyl-1,3-dioxetane

Five atoms in ring
1,2-Dioxolane
1,3-Dioxolane